The term "Jewish life" typically refers to the life of a Jew.

Jewish Life may also refer to:
 Jewish Currents (Jewish Life until 1956) - a magazine founded in 1946
 Jewish Life Television - a TV network founded in 2007
 Steinhardt Foundation for Jewish Life (originally Jewish Life Network) - an American education foundation founded in 1994